The Minister of Sport, Arts and Culture is a Minister in the Cabinet of South Africa. The minister is responsible for sport, recreation and culture in South Africa. , the current minister is Zizi Kodwa.

References

External links
Department of Sport and Recreation

Lists of political office-holders in South Africa
South African Ministers for Sport and Recreation